Mr. Len (Leonard "Lenny" Smythe) is a hip hop DJ born in the Bronx, New York. He moved to Hillside, NJ when he was 12 years old. He was a member, with Bigg Jus and El-P, of the underground hip hop trio Company Flow, which disbanded in the late 1990s. His debut full-length, released on Matador Records in 2001, included guest spots by Jean Grae, Chubb Rock, and Mr. Live. Later he formed a group with Kimani Rogers from The Masterminds named Roosevelt Franklin. He also collaborated with Handsome Boy Modeling School member Prince Paul to produce the faux-doo wop group The Dix. Mr. Len was also a voice actor in the American action comedy television series, Kung Faux.

Discography

Mr. Len

Albums
 Pity the Fool: Experiments in therapy behind the mask of music while handing out dummy smacks (Matador Records, 2001)
 Class X, A Tribute to Company Flow (Smacks Records, 2004)
 Beats and Things, Vol. 1 (Smacks Records, 2004)
 The Marvels of Yestermorrow (W.A.R. Media, 2013)

EPs/singles
This Morning (Matador Records, 1999)
What the Fuck/Straight (Matador, 2000)

Company Flow
 Funcrusher (Official Recordings, 1995)
 Funcrusher Plus (Rawkus Records, 1997)
 Little Johnny from the Hospitul: Breaks & Instrumentals Vol.1 (Rawkus Records, 1999)

Roosevelt Franklin
 Something's Got to Give (Third Earth Music, 2003)

The Dix
The Art of Picking Up Women (Smacks Records, 2005)

Production/album appearances
 Armand Van Helden, “Rock Da Spot”, 2 Future 4 U, Armed Records - 1999
 Roger Sanchez, “Buffalo Gals Stampede [S-Man's Spicy Buffalo Wings Dub]” Maximum House & Garage, EMI Int’l - 1999
 Bill Laswell/Material, "This Morning" feat. Juggaknots, Intonarumori, Palm Pictures Audio - 1999
 The Masterminds, “The Fast Way”, Live From Area 51: The Extraterrestrial Project, Exodus Entertainment - 1999
 Twigy, Seven Dimensions Remix LP (Japanese Release), 2000
 MC Paul Barman, "School Anthem", It's Very Stimulating, Wordsound - 2000
 DJ Krush "Vision Of Art" feat. Company Flow/Scratches by Mr. Len, Zen, Red Int / Red Ink - 2001
 Princess Superstar, "Trouble", Is, Rapster - 2002
 Jean Grae, "What Would I Do" and "Knock", Attack of the Attacking Things, Third Earth Music - 2002
 Prince Paul, “Ralph Nader” skit, Politics of the Business, Razor & Tie - 2003
 Indelible MCs (El-P, J-Treds, Juggaknots), "Weight", Lyricist Lounge Vol. 1, Priority Records - 1999, Re-released 2004
 Jedi Mind Tricks, "Words from Mr. Len 1 & 2", Violent By Design, Landspeed - 2000, Re-released 2004
 Mass Influence, "Analyze" (Single), Boulevard/Nonstop - 2000
 Various Artists, “Hip Hop for Respect” (Single), Rawkus Records - 2000
 Murs, "Take Yo Ass to the Store" (Single), Smacks Records - 2003
 Mr. Dead feat. Sayyid (Anti-Pop), "Dynamic Tension" (Single) 2005

References

External links
Stealth Magazine Company Flow video interview February 2000

Year of birth missing (living people)
Living people
American hip hop DJs
Matador Records artists
People from the Bronx
DJs from New York City
Company Flow members